"Gives You Hell" is a song by American rock band the All-American Rejects, released as the lead single from their third studio album, When the World Comes Down on September 30, 2008.

The song is The All-American Rejects' most successful song to date, receiving positive reviews and topping the Billboards Mainstream Top 40 and Adult Top 40 charts as well as peaking at number four on the Hot 100 chart. It was certified RIAA 4× Platinum for four million shipments.

Background and composition
"Gives You Hell" was written by Nick Wheeler and Tyson Ritter in Vancouver, British Columbia, Canada on a secluded writing trip for the band's third studio album, and recorded at George Lucas' Skywalker Ranch studios in California.

Ritter stated the song "is about this asshole, it's a dude who will never know it's about him. It's kind of this tongue-in-cheek way of looking at someone you hate, whether it's your mom, for some reason, or it's your teacher at school, or it's your boss at work. It's just someone who makes you struggle, and it's giving them the finger."

In an interview with Vevo, the pair described how the song started out as "a cheesy whirl on a drum-loop", and how unsure they were on its sound that it nearly did not make the final track listing for When the World Comes Down. But after a phone conversation with music producer Jimmy Iovine, who praised the song's lyrics and instrumental mix, the band decided to add it to the album's track list.

On the composition of the track, Wheeler described the process, "You hear an acoustic guitar, like this wacky E6 chord fading in the beginning and that's all you hear. Yeah, that's all you hear until the second verse. Then a little acoustic guitar comes in – actually the acoustic guitar carries the whole thing until that last chorus. That's when like the big monster comes in. It's just the acoustic guitar in the chorus and you hear that little lead line right before the 3rd verse. It's little moments like that. If every part on the record is thought out and holds its place in the song, then you don't need more than just those special parts. It's not about taking a big guitar and layering the crap out of it. It's not about that. Every part, from the vocals to the guitar parts to the drum fills, really hold their place in the song."

In a further interview with MTV, Wheeler commented that "We wanted the backing vocalists to sound like a —'bunch of drunk assholes', so we had the crew and us drink a beer for every take and yelled the chorus into a microphone. We got so drunk we were over-thinking it!"

Reception

Critical reception
The song received favorable reviews from music critics. About.com rated the track four out of five stars and described it as a "soulful groove", saying "The lyrics are filled with a cleverly snarky attitude. The attitude of 'Dirty Little Secret' is here in full force, and you will likely find yourself singing along", while Digital Spy, who rated the track three out of five stars, described it as "Sum 41-style guitars and a cheery singalong outro, it certainly isn't innovative, but as many of their contemporaries have begun dabbling in politics and darker musical styles, there's a certain charm to the band's blissful ignorance of changing fashions."

Billboard compared the sound of the track to Queen's "We Will Rock You".

In 2018, Rock Sound magazine listed the song as the fourth best break-up song of all time.

Chart performance
In the United States, "Gives You Hell" entered the Billboard Hot 100 at position number 69 and climbed steadily for seven weeks before breaking into the top 10 at position number 10, giving the band their third and last top 10 hit on the chart, before eventually peaking at number four on the Hot 100, making "Gives You Hell" the All-American Rejects' most successful single to date and their first top five hit, remaining in the charts for 36 weeks before it was retired. It spent 14 consecutive weeks in the top 10, including five weeks in the top five.

The song eventually topped the US Billboard Top 40 Mainstream chart in March 2009, and followed on to reach the top spot of the US Hot Adult Top 40 Tracks the following May, making "Gives You Hell" the band's first ever number one on any music chart to date. Internationally, the track became The All-American Rejects' best-selling single, reaching the top five in Canada and Australia and the top 20 in the United Kingdom, Ireland, and New Zealand by early 2009.

In late 2009, Billboard announced that "Gives You Hell" was the most played song of that year on their top 40 chart. The song also became the 42nd biggest selling rock song of the 21st century in the United Kingdom.

Accolades

Music video
The music video for "Gives You Hell" was directed by Marc Webb and shot in October 2008 in California and was released a month later on November 3. It revolves around two alter egos of lead singer/keyboardist/bassist Tyson Ritter – one as a traditional family man and the other as a lay-about nocturnal garage band singer (the band of which is made up of the other members of the All-American Rejects) – as neighbors annoying and pulling pranks on each other due to their different lifestyles and behaviors, while scenes of the band themselves performing the song as the garage band are overlapped through the video.

A second version was later released in January 2009, primarily featuring an extended version of the performance scene from the first.

In an interview with MTV about the video, Ritter said "The video basically pits one neighbor against another terrible neighbor, who lives on a completely opposite schedule. He's not on the grid – he's not on, like the song says, 'a 9-to-5 pace.' And this guy's living the cookie-cutter life, with his white picket fence, and his wife who brings him lemonade when he's washing the car, So it's kind of like the clash of those worlds; only at the end, there's kind of a twist, where the two worlds kind of flip-flop."

Appearances in popular culture
"Gives You Hell" was featured on the musical comedy-drama television show Glee in the episode "Hell-O". The song was sung by the character Rachel Berry played by Lea Michele. The Glee version reached the top of Irish Singles Chart.

The song is also featured in the video games Rock Band, Guitar Hero 5, Band Hero and Tap Tap Revenge 2. The song is also used as intro music for the home games of the Missouri Mavericks hockey team in Independence, Missouri.

In the episode three of Betas, a background person is singing "Gives You Hell" for karaoke. 

The song "Don't Freak Out" by LilHuddy samples the track, which credits both Ritter and Wheeler accordingly.

Track listing

Charts

Weekly charts

Year-end charts

Decade-end charts

All-time charts

Certifications

Release history

References

Bibliography
 Interscope Database Info

2008 singles
The All-American Rejects songs
Music videos directed by Marc Webb
2008 songs
Song recordings produced by Eric Valentine
Interscope Records singles
Songs written by Tyson Ritter
Songs written by Nick Wheeler